The 2015 KBO League season was the 34th season in the history of the Korea Professional Baseball league.

Season structure

Regular season 
Due to the addition of the KT Wiz into the KBO, the 2015 KBO league schedule was increased to each team playing 144 games during the regular season (each team had played 128 games during the 2014 regular season), with each team playing each other 16 times.

All-Star Game
In July, the best players participated in the 2015 KBO All-Star Game. The participating franchises were divided into two regions, the Dream All-Stars (Samsung Lions, Doosan Bears, Lotte Giants, SK Wyverns, KT Wiz) and Nanum All-Stars (Kia Tigers, Hanwha Eagles, LG Twins, Nexen Heroes, NC Dinos). The Korean All-Star Game did not determine home-field advantage in the Korean Series. The All-Star Game was played on 18 July 2015 at the Suwon Baseball Stadium and won by the Dream All-Stars 6–3.

Postseason
2015 KBO League season culminated in its championship series, known as the Korean Series. The Semi-Playoff format was tweaked. Previously, the top four teams after the end of the regular season qualified for the postseason, but in 2015, the top five teams qualified for the postseason. The team with the best record gained a direct entry into the Korean Series, while the other four teams competed for the remaining place in a step-ladder playoff system. Starting in 2015, the fourth-place and the fifth-place teams played in a "Wildcard" game.

Wildcard (best-of-two)
Regular Season 4th place vs. Regular Season 5th place
Semi-Playoff (best-of-five, added from 3 games starting from 2008)
Regular Season 3rd place vs. Wild Card Winner
Playoff (best-of-five, reduced from 7 games starting from 2009)
Regular Season 2nd place vs. Semi-Playoff Winner
Korean Series (best-of-seven)
Regular Season 1st place vs. Playoff Winner

To Determine the Final Standings
Champion (1st place): Korean Series Winner
Runner-up (2nd place): Korean Series Loser
3rd–10th place: Sort by Regular Season record except teams playing in the Korean Series.

Standings

Source

Foreign hitters 
Each team could have signed up to three foreign players. Due to the high proportion of pitchers signed in previous years, beginning in 2014 the league mandated that at least one of the foreign players must be a position player.

Postseason

Wild Card
The series started with a 1–0 advantage for the fourth-placed team.

Semi-playoff

Playoff

Korean Series

References

External links
Official website

KBO League seasons
KBO League season
KBO League season